Quinton Alston (born September 7, 1993) is an American football linebacker. He played college football at Iowa.

Tampa Bay Buccaneers

Alston was signed as an undrafted rookie on May 5, 2015. Cut from the bucs on August 25, 2015

References

External links
Tampa Bay Buccaneers bio

Living people
American football linebackers
Tampa Bay Buccaneers players
1993 births
People from Winslow Township, New Jersey
Iowa Hawkeyes football players